Calthwaite is a small village in rural Cumbria, England, situated between the small market town of Penrith and the larger city of Carlisle. It is within of the civil parish of Hesket and the district of Eden, and has a population of around 100 people. In 1870-72 the township had a population of 269.

The village contains a primary school, a Church of England Church, a pre-school nursery and a  pub called the Globe Inn.

The school has around 68 pupils, and 3 teachers. There are three classes, Class 1 consisting of reception and year 1, Class 2 consisting of Year 2 & Year 3 and Class 3 which is years 4-6. The Head Teacher is Mr. Harvey.

Calthwaite Hall dates back to 1837 and has been run as a holiday and wedding venue.

Two miles south-east of the village, Brackenburgh Old Tower is a late 14th or early 15th century pele tower adjoining a large 19th-century house at Brackenburgh Hall.

See also

Listed buildings in Hesket, Cumbria

References

External links
 Cumbria County History Trust: Hesket in the Forest (nb: provisional research only – see Talk page)

Villages in Cumbria
Inglewood Forest
Eden District